is a metro station on the Sendai Subway Namboku Line in Taihaku-ku, Sendai, Miyagi Prefecture, Japan.

Lines

Station layout
Tomizawa Station is an elevated station with a single island platform serving two tracks. The station building is located underneath the tracks.

Platforms

Passenger statistics
In fiscal 2015, the station was used by an average of 6,635 passengers daily.

Surrounding area
 Kamei Arena Sendai (The home arena of the Sendai 89ers of Bj league.)
 Sendai Tramway Museum (Sendai Shiden Museum)

History
Tomizawa Station was opened on 15 July 1987.

References

External links

Railway stations in Sendai
Sendai Subway Namboku Line
Railway stations in Japan opened in 1987